The Third N. Chandrababu Naidu ministry of the state of Andhra Pradesh was formed on 8 June 2014 headed by N. Chandrababu Naidu as the Chief Minister following the 2014 Andhra Pradesh Legislative Assembly election after the bifurcation of the United Andhra Pradesh into Andhra Pradesh and Telangana.

Background
The State Cabinet of Andhra Pradesh was sworn in on 8 June 2014. A total of 26 ministers including N. Chandrababu Naidu took charge as the Chief Minister of Andhra Pradesh.

In 2017 And 2018 Cabinet Was Reshuffled.

Council of Ministers

Key
  Resigned from office

See also
 Andhra Pradesh Council of Ministers
 N. Kiran Kumar Reddy ministry
 Y. S. Jagan Mohan Reddy ministry

Notes

References

Andhra Pradesh ministries
Bharatiya Janata Party state ministries
Telugu Desam Party
2014 establishments in Andhra Pradesh
Cabinets established in 2014
Cabinets disestablished in 2019
2019 disestablishments in India